Tytan is a British rock band that lasted about two years during the early 1980s by former Angel Witch bassist Kev Riddles. The album Rough Justice was released after their split. They formed out of the New Wave of British Heavy Metal movement and are best known for their strong melodies. The band reformed in 2012 to play Keep It True in Germany and have been touring since. In 2016 the band recorded a follow-up album Justice Served with Chris Tsangarides for High Roller Records. It was released in May 2017.

History 
Tytan was formed at the height of the new wave of British heavy metal in the autumn of 1981 by the former Angel Witch rhythm section, bassist Kevin Riddles and drummer Dave Dufort (ex-E. F. Band), Scottish vocalist Norman 'Kal' Swan, and guitarists Steve Gibbs and Glasgow born Stewartie Adams. The latter unfortunately had to leave the band and Gary Owens (ex-A II Z, Aurora) had a brief stay before Steve Mann (ex-Liar, Lionheart) joined.

Signed to Kamaflage Records, a subsidiary of DJM, Tytan recorded their lone album at Ramport Studios in Battersea with Will Reid-Dick manning the boards. Former Judas Priest and Lionheart drummer Les Binks joined the band just in time for the recording in place of Dave Dufort. Jody Turner of Rock Goddess made a guest vocal appearance on the song 'Women On The Frontline.' Binks would be replaced by Tony Boden on the band's October 1982 UK tour with the Tygers of Pan Tang who was gone shortly thereafter, replaced by Simon Wright (ex-Tora Tora, A II Z, Aurora).

Kamaflage folded before the album was released but managed to release the single 'Blind Men and Fools' in both 7" and 12" formats in September 1982 before the band split up the following summer. Wright would join AC/DC and subsequently work with Dio, Rhino Bucket, and UFO. Vocalist Kal Swan moved to Los Angeles, where he formed the band Lion with former Lone Star guitarist Tony Smith whose replacement was future Dio and Whitesnake guitarist Doug Aldrich. Swan and Aldrich went on to record a further 3 albums in the 1990s under the name Bad Moon Rising. Steve Mann returned to Lionheart and recorded the 1984 Hot Tonight album with the band before joining the McAuley Schenker Group, Sweet, and German prog rock act Eloy.

In 1985, London-based label Metal Masters released the shelved Tytan tapes as the Rough Justice LP. A Japanese CD bootleg followed in the early 1990s, before Majestic Rock Records gave the album an official CD re-issue in 2004 and again in 2006, with 4 BBC 'Friday Rock Show' session live tracks ('Cold Bitch', 'The Watcher', 'Far Side of Destiny' and 'Blind Men and Fools') and a live DVD added as bonus on the second edition.

In 2012, an invitation to perform at Keep It True XV Festival in Germany saw Tytan reform with a revised line-up. Joining original band members Kevin Riddles, Steve Gibbs and Steve Mann were vocalist Tom Barna (from the band Diamond Faith), Andrew Thompson on keyboards, and Angel Witch drummer Andrew Prestidge. Steve Gibbs left the band in early 2014. Drummers Chris Benton and then Mikey Ciancio joined during 2012 and 2013 respectively, and between 2015 and 2017 James Wise took over the role, followed by current drummer Seth Markes. Meanwhile, Dave Strange joined the band in November 2014, when Steve Mann departed. Dave Strange was replaced in 2021 by guitarist Peter Welsh. Tom Barna's replacement, Tony Coldham, performed his last show with the band on 13 October 2018, as he had decided to concentrate on his other outfit, The Deep.  In December 2018, the band recruited vocalist Grant Foster. In 2021, Tony Coldham returned to complete the current Tytan lineup.

In 2017, Tytan released their follow-up album to Rough Justice, Justice Served, through German label, High Roller Records. At the same time, the company also re-issued the group's out-of-print debut album, Rough Justice.

Discography 
Blind Men and Fools 7"& 12" (Kamaflage, 1982)
Rough Justice (Metal Masters, 1985 / Majestic Rock, 2004 & 2006/ High Roller Records 2017)
Justice Served (High Roller, 2017)

See also 
List of new wave of British heavy metal bands

References

External links 
Tytan Facebook page
Tytan on Spotify
Tytan on Apple Music

English heavy metal musical groups
Musical groups established in 1981
Musical groups from London
New Wave of British Heavy Metal musical groups